Prunus lundelliana, and nail wamal in the Tzeltal language, is a species of Prunus native to southern Mexico and to northern Central America. It is a tree reaching 10m. It is a common understory species in montane cloud forests, preferring to grow on the sides of streams. It resembles Prunus tetradenia, but with significantly smaller leaves, and in the position of certain of the leaf glands. The wood is dense and darkly colored. The white 4 to 6mm flowers are borne on axillary racemes. The fruit, a drupe, is black, 8 to 10mm, with very little flesh.

References

lundelliana
Flora of Mexico
Flora of Central America
Plants described in 1940